"Kansas City" is the first single by Australian dance group Sneaky Sound System, taken from their second studio album 2.

The Adam Callen directed music video was nominated for Best Video at the ARIA Music Awards of 2008.

Track listing

Music video
The music video for the song features a yellow brick road and dancing puppets including one that looks like the character of Dorothy from the Wizard of Oz. In the Wizard of Oz Dorothy Gale was from the US state of Kansas. The Kansas City most people recognize (from skyline photos and sports teams) is the city in the US state of Missouri.  Still, references to Kansas City being in Kansas can be technically correct because there is a separate municipality of Kansas City, Kansas across the Kansas-Missouri border from Kansas City, Missouri.

Charts and certifications
Kansas City has been the band's second highest-peaking single ever. Second after their 2007 hit "UFO" which peaked at number #11. The single certified Gold with sales of up to 35,000

Weekly charts

(*) indicates that the Club/lifelike/Tomboy/Ben's Red Eye/Sam La More mix charted

Year-end charts

Release history

External links
"Kansas City" CD single on Waterfront Records

References

Sneaky Sound System songs
2008 singles
2008 songs
Songs written by Connie Mitchell
Songs about Kansas
Songs about Missouri